Jeremy Podeswa (born 1962) is a Canadian film and television director. He is best known for directing the films The Five Senses (1999) and Fugitive Pieces (2007). He has also worked as director on the television shows Six Feet Under, Nip/Tuck, The Tudors, Queer as Folk, and the HBO World War II miniseries The Pacific. He has also written several films.

In 2014, he directed episodes five and six of the fifth season of the HBO series Game of Thrones, earning a Primetime Emmy Award nomination for Outstanding Directing for a Drama Series for the latter episode. He returned the next season, directing the season premiere and the second episode. He also directed the season premiere as well as the season finale of the seventh season. In 2021, he directed episodes of the TV series adaptation of The Mosquito Coast and the miniseries Station Eleven.

Biography 
Jeremy Podeswa was born in 1962 in Toronto, Ontario. He is Jewish, and his Polish Jewish father, a painter, was the only one of his immediate family to make it out of the German Nazi camps alive. He attended the Community Hebrew Academy of Toronto before graduating from Ryerson University's Film Studies program and the American Film Institute's Center for Advanced Film Studies (now the AFI Conservatory). He has recently identified as queer and states that it is only one part of his identity:

"...my sexual orientation is one element among others. I believe that the experience of belonging to a minority, whether tied to sexual orientation, religion or race, changes your perspective you can have on of our environment and things in life. My orientation is only one part of me: I am Jewish, my parents are immigrants, I am North American. All these things and many others make what I am. It would be very restrictive, even a mistake, to say that my work or any other filmmaker’s can be reduced to the dimension of sexual orientation."

He was part of a loosely affiliated group of filmmakers to emerge in the 1980s from Toronto known as the Toronto New Wave.

In 1983, 21-year-old Podeswa used his student loans to make his first short film, titled David Roche Talks to You About Love —a 22-minute performance about a gay actor and his views on love. The aspiring director then took jobs as a production assistant, assistant editor and a publicist before he started directing his own films. During the eighties and nineties when he just started his career, he made Canadian indie shorts and features such as The Five Senses, Eclipse, and Fugitive Pieces (2008), loosely based on a novel by Anne Michael, which was awarded the opening night slot at the 2007 International Film Festival. The film has since received critical acclaim. Podeswa has recently made a name for himself directing critically acclaimed and commercially successful television shows, such as Boardwalk Empire, Six Feet Under, True Blood, Dexter, Game of Thrones and Queer as Folk.

Awards 
Altogether, Jeremy Podeswa has won 20 awards while having 34 nominations for his expert works. Podeswa was given two Genie Awards in 2000 as Best Director of The Five Senses, which was awarded Best Picture.

In addition, he won an award at NewFest: New York's LGBT Film Festival for the Best Short. Podeswa won an award at the Newport Beach Film Festival in 2008 for Best Film, Best Director, and Best Screenplay. In addition he won Best Short at the San Francisco International Lesbian & Gay Film Festival. His most recent accomplishments occurred in 2015 and 2018, where he was nominated for a Primetime Emmy Award for Outstanding Direction of a Drama Series with Game of Thrones.

Filmography

Television
 List of Podeswa's directed television shows

Films

References

External links 
 

AFI Conservatory alumni
Canadian television directors
Film directors from Toronto
Best Director Genie and Canadian Screen Award winners
LGBT film directors
Living people
1962 births
Date of birth missing (living people)
German-language film directors
Canadian gay writers
Canadian LGBT screenwriters
Writers from Toronto
Toronto Metropolitan University alumni
Canadian people of Polish-Jewish descent
LGBT television directors
Canadian male screenwriters
20th-century Canadian screenwriters
21st-century Canadian screenwriters
Gay screenwriters
21st-century Canadian LGBT people
20th-century Canadian LGBT people